Stevan Walton (born 23 April 1985 in Bromsgrove) is a shooter from Redditch who won a gold medal in Commonwealth Games held from 3–14 October 2010 in Delhi, India.
He won, with Steven Scott, the men's double trap pairs event on 6 October 2010.

Walton was introduced to shooting due to his godfather owning a shooting ground. From here he participated in county shooting and then advanced to national shooting.

References

English male sport shooters
Living people
Sportspeople from Bromsgrove
Sportspeople from Redditch
Shooters at the 2010 Commonwealth Games
Commonwealth Games gold medallists for England
1985 births
Commonwealth Games medallists in shooting
Medallists at the 2010 Commonwealth Games